Barikayi (also Romanized as Bārīkāyī; also known as Bārīkā) is a village in Gavork-e Sardasht Rural District, in the Central District of Sardasht County, West Azerbaijan Province, Iran. At the 2006 census, its population was 179, in 34 families.

References 

Populated places in Sardasht County